Taraggi FK was an Azerbaijani football club based in Ganja.

History 
The club was founded in 2011 after division of FC Kəpəz, where FC Kəpəz promoted to Azerbaijan Premier League, while Taraggi will be playing in Azerbaijan First Division in 2011 as independent club.

On 21 April 2013, the club announced to be defunct after financial problems and stopped their participation in First Division.

League and domestic cup history

Managers 
 Fuad Ismayilov (2011)
 Vasif Aliyev (2012–2013)

References

External links 
 Taraggi FC at PFL.AZ

Tarraggi FC
Sport in Ganja, Azerbaijan
Association football clubs established in 2011
Association football clubs disestablished in 2013
2011 establishments in Azerbaijan
Defunct football clubs in Azerbaijan